Bang Na is one of the fifty districts (khet) of Bangkok, Thailand. Its neighbors, clockwise from the north, are the Phra Khanong and Prawet Districts of Bangkok and Bang Phli, Mueang Samut Prakan, and Phra Pradaeng Districts of Samut Prakan province.

History
Bang Na was once a sub-district of Phra Khanong. It became a separate district on 6 March 1998.

Administration

The district has two sub-districts (khwaeng).

Places
Bangkok International Trade and Exhibition Centre (BITEC) is a major convention and exhibition center. Among its regularly hosted events is the annual Bangkok International Motor Show. Several temples are in the district: Wat Bang Na Nai (วัดบางนาใน), Wat Bang Na Nok (วัดบางนานอก), Wat Si Iam (วัดศรีเอี่ยม), and Wat Phong Phloi Witthayaram (วัดผ่องพลอยวิทยาราม). CentralPlaza Bangna, formerly Central City Bangna, is one of the first shopping malls in Bang Na. Unlike most shopping centres in Thailand, it has a theme park and water theme park on upper floors. Royal Dragon Restaurant or Mang Korn Lung (มังกรหลวง) formerly held the Guinness Book record as the world's largest restaurant from 1992 to 2008. It is an outdoor seafood restaurant 1.6 hectares in size. Waiters roller-skate to serve food from the kitchen to the tables. As the district flourished from these attractions, on May 5, 2012, one of Thailand's top 10 shopping malls called Megabangna Shopping Center was built. There are department stores, supermarkets, restaurants, movie theater, ice rink, and a game arcade inside the shopping mall.

Transportation
The Sukhumvit Line of the BTS Skytrain runs through the area along Sukhumvit Road. The extension into Bang Na, which is the one of largest highways in the world opened in August 2011 with three stations: Udom Suk, Bang Na, and Bearing. The Bang Na station is about 500 m from BITEC. Sukhumvit Road and Bang Na-Trat Highway are two main highways linking Bangkok to eastern Thailand. On top of Bang Na-Trat Highway is the 55 km Burapha Withi Expressway reaching Chonburi province. Suvarnabhumi Airport can be accessed from the south via Bang Na-Trat and Burapha Withi as an alternative to the Bangkok-Chonburi Highway (motorway) from the north.

Education

The International Community School, the Bangkok Patana School, and Glory Singapore International School are in the Bang Na District.

References

External links

 Official website of the district
 BMA website with the tourist landmarks of Bang Na

 
Districts of Bangkok